Do It Yourself is the only album by the Seahorses, an English alternative rock band that John Squire, formerly guitarist in the Stone Roses formed. The album's cover features a photograph of Squire's 1996 sculpture in the shape of globe made of puzzle pieces and also named Do It Yourself.

The album was released to mixed-to-positive reviews, but was well received by the British public. It entered the UK Albums Chart at #2, behind Gary Barlow's solo debut Open Road, and went on to gain platinum status after selling over 300,000 copies in the UK alone. The album featured three charting UK singles: "Love Is the Law" (No. 3), "Blinded by the Sun" (No. 7), and "Love Me and Leave Me" (No. 16), the latter of which was Liam Gallagher's first songwriting credit. NME readers voted The Seahorses the fourth best new act of 1997; Guitarist magazine readers voted Do It Yourself the tenth-best album of the year.

A short UK tour in December 1997, with support from American alternative rock band Third Eye Blind, promoted the album's release, as did subsequent support slots with The Rolling Stones, U2 and Oasis. Ongoing recording sessions, which yielded the 1997 single "You Can Talk to Me" (UK #15, US Modern Rock Tracks #30), were aborted in January 1999, and the band split soon after, without completing the planned follow-up to Do It Yourself.

Track listing
All songs composed by John Squire unless otherwise noted.

 "I Want You to Know" – 4:52 (Chris Helme, Stuart Fletcher)
 "Blinded by the Sun" – 4:39 (Helme)
 "Suicide Drive" – 3:31
 "Boy in the Picture" – 2:54
 "Love Is the Law" – 7:43
 "Happiness is Egg-Shaped" – 3:45
 "Love Me and Leave Me" – 3:55 (Squire, Liam Gallagher)
 "Round the Universe" – 3:45
 "1999" – 3:25
 "Standing on Your Head" – 4:39
 "Hello" – 2:22 (Helme)

Personnel
The Seahorses
Chris Helme - vocals, acoustic guitar
John Squire - guitar, artwork
Stuart Fletcher - bass guitar
Andy Watts - drums, backing vocals
with:
Lili Haydn - violin
Technical
Tony Visconti - production, arrangements, conductor, mellotron, tambura, theremin
Jeff Thomas - engineer
Rob Jacobs - recording, mixing

Charts

Weekly charts

Year-end charts

Singles

References

External links

Do It Yourself at YouTube (streamed copy where licensed)

1997 debut albums
Albums produced by Tony Visconti
Geffen Records albums
The Seahorses albums